The American Society of Agronomy (ASA) is a scientific and professional society of agronomists and scientists of related disciplines, principally in the United States but with many non-U.S. members as well.

About 
It was founded December 13, 1907 with the objective of 'the increase and dissemination of knowledge concerning soils, crops, and the conditions affecting them. One of its founding members was Charles Piper, who would become its president in 1914. The first president was Mark A. Carleton and the first annual meeting was held in Washington, D.C., in 1908.

Two daughter societies were subsequently formed, the Soil Science Society of America (SSSA) and the Crop Science Society of America (CSSA). These 3 societies, the Agricultural Tri-Societies, each have their own boards of directors, their own bylaws, and their own membership rosters.  The societies each minimize their expenses by sharing an office and staff (who job-share between the 3 societies), and their annual meetings are generally held together.

On April 17, 1948, the group incorporated. The ASA is headquartered in Madison, Wisconsin, and publishes a number of scientific journals, including Agronomy Journal. The ASA holds annual meetings, attended by thousands of its members.

Presidents
The following members served as President of the Society on the year listed:

 Mark A. Carleton, 1908
 George Nelson Coffey, 1909
 Albert M. Ten Eyck, 1910
 Homer Jay Wheeler, 1911
 Roscoe W. Thatcher, 1912
 Louis A. Clinton, 1913
 Charles V. Piper, 1914
 Charles E. Thorne, 1915
 Carleton R. Ball, 1916
 William M. Jardine, 1917
 Thomas Lyttleton Lyon, 1918
 Jacob G. Lipman, 1919
 Franklin Stewart Harris, 1920
 Charles Ansel Mooers, 1921
 Leland E. Call, 1922
 Sidney Burritt Haskell, 1923
 Merrit F. Miller, 1924
 Clyde W. Warburton, 1925
 Carlos G. Williams, 1926
 William L. Burlison, 1927
 Arthur G. McCall, 1928
 Marion Jacob Funchess, 1929
 Walter P. Kelley, 1930
 William W. Burr, 1931
 Percy Edgar Brown, 1932
 Max Adams McCall, 1933
 Ray Iams Throckmorton, 1934
 Herbert Kendall Hayes, 1935
 Robert M. Salter, 1936
 Frederick D. Richey, 1937
 Emil Truog, 1938
 Ralph John Garber, 1939
 Frederick James Always, 1940
 Lawrence Kirk, 1941
 Richard Bradfield, 1942
 Franklin David Keim, 1943
 Frank Parker, 1944-1945
 Harold D. Hughes, 1946
 William Pierre, 1947
 Olaf Aamodt, 1948
 Firman Bear, 1949
 Laurence Graber, 1950
 Herbert P. Cooper, 1951
 David “Scotty” Robertson, 1952
 Harold Myers, 1953
 Charles Julius Willard, 1954
 George Pohlman, 1955
 Iver. J. Johnson, 1956
 Arthur G. Norman, 1957
 Will M. Myers, 1958
 John Peterson, 1959
 George F. Sprague, 1960
 Bertram Bertramson, 1961
 Glenn W. Burton, 1962
 Morell Russell, 1963
 Howard B. Sprague, 1964
 Lorenzo A. Richards, 1965
 Herbert Kramer, 1966
 Robert S.Whitney, 1967
 David Clyde Smith, 1968
 Werner Nelson, 1969
 Roy Blaser, 1970
 Charles Allen Black, 1971
 J. Ritchie Cowan, 1972
 Horace Cheney, 1973
 Darell McCloud, 1974

References

External links
American Society of Agronomy Website

Professional associations based in the United States
Soil and crop science organizations
1907 establishments in the United States
Scientific organizations established in 1907
Agricultural organizations based in the United States